This is the complete filmography of actress Jayne Meadows (September 27, 1919 – April 26, 2015)

Film and television appearances

1946: Undercurrent as Sylvia Lea Burton
1946: Lady in the Lake as Mildred Havelend
1947: Dark Delusion as Mrs. Selkirk
1947: Song of the Thin Man as Janet Thayar
1948: The Luck of the Irish as Frances Augur
1948: Enchantment as Selina Dane
1951: The Fat Man as Jane Adams
1951: David and Bathsheba as Michal
1952: Robert Montgomery Presents (TV Series)
1952: Woman with a Sword (TV Movie) as Anna Ella Carroll
1952: Pulitzer Prize Playhouse (TV Series)
1952: Kraft Theatre (TV Series)
1952–1953: Danger (TV Series)
1953: Suspense (TV Series) as Helen Brady
1953: The Web (TV Series)
1954: Ponds Theater (TV Series)
1955: The United States Steel Hour (TV Series) as Cora
1955: Jane Wyman Presents The Fireside Theatre (TV Series) as Alice
1956: Studio One in Hollywood (TV Series) as Leslie
1957–1963: The Red Skelton Hour (TV Series) as Mrs. Cavendish / Gloria Dalton / Ruby / Ruthie / Clem's Greedy Relative
1959: It Happened to Jane as herself
1959: The Ann Sothern Show (TV Series) as Liza Vincent
1960: College Confidential as Betty Duquesne
1960: General Electric Theater (TV Series) as Jean Fletcher
1962: The DuPont Show of the Week (TV Series) as Myra
1964: The Eleventh Hour (TV Series) as Mrs. Bredan
1968: Good Morning World (TV Series) as Mary Margaret
1968: Now You See It, Now You Don't (TV Movie) as Ida
1969: The Outsider (TV Series) as Lil
1969: Here Come the Brides (TV Series) as Eleanor Tangiers
1969–1972: Medical Center (TV Series) as Nurse Chambers
1970: Love, American Style (TV Series) as Tana Wright (segment "Love and the Many Married Couple")
1970: Here's Lucy (TV Series) as Laura Trenton
1972: The New Temperatures Rising Show (TV Series) as Miss Brandon
1973: Adam-12 (TV Series) as Ida Huntington
1974: The Girl with Something Extra (TV Series) as Mrs. Elkins
1974: Witness to Yesterday (TV Series) as Cleopatra
1976: James Dean (TV Movie) as Reva Randall
1976: Norman... Is That You? as Adele Hobart
1976: The Practice (TV Series) as Mrs. Milnor
1976: The Nancy Walker Show (TV Series) as Georgia
1977: Switch (TV Series) as Andrea
1977: Sex and the Married Woman (TV Movie) as Irma Caddish
1977: Have I Got a Christmas for You (TV Movie) as Rita
1977–1981: Meeting of Minds (TV Series) as Catherine the Great / Margaret Sanger / Florence Nightingale / Dark Lady of the Sonnets / Elizabeth Barrett Browning / Marie Antoinette / Cleopatra
1978–1987: The Love Boat (TV Series) as Jayne Meadows / Janice / Mrs. Tate / Gwen Finley / Gertrude Benson / Myrna Foster
1979: The Paper Chase (TV Series) as Marian Chandler
1979: Project U.F.O. (TV Series) as Marlene Baker
1979: Hawaii Five-O (TV Series) as Jessica Humboldt
1979–1983: Fantasy Island (TV Series) as Margaret Wharton / Beatrice Solomon / Contessa / Liz Merrill / Nadine Winslow
1980: Tenspeed and Brown Shoe (TV Series) as Ruth LaCross
1980: The Gossip Columnist (TV Movie) as Jayne Meadows
1980–1982: Trapper John, M.D. (TV Series) as Melissa / Edwina Garth
1981: Rise and Shine (TV Series) as Mrs. Moffett
1981: Aloha Paradise (TV Series)
1982: Miss All-American Beauty (TV Movie) as Gertrude Hunnicutt
1982–1983: It's Not Easy (TV Series, Recurring role) as Ruth Long
1983: Matt Houston (TV Series) as Holly Harkens
1985: Hotel (TV Series) as Fran Clark
1985: Da Capo as Mrs. Thomas
1985: Alice in Wonderland (TV Movie) as The Queen of Hearts
1986: Murder, She Wrote (TV Series) as Lila Lee Amberson
1986: A Masterpiece of Murder (TV Movie) as Matilda Hussey
1986: Crazy Like a Fox (TV Series)
1987–1988: St. Elsewhere (TV Series, Recurring role) as Olga Osoranski
1989: Parent Trap: Hawaiian Honeymoon (TV Movie) as Charlotte Brink
1990: Murder by Numbers as Pamela
1990: The Jackie Bison Show (TV Series) as Mrs. St. Fawn
1991: City Slickers as Mitch's Mom
1991: Square One Television (TV Series) as Lady Esther Astor Astute
1991: Mathnet (TV Series) as Lady Esther Astor Astute
1992: The Player as herself
1993: Sisters (TV Series) as Ida Benbow
1993: For Goodness Sake (Short)
1994: Tom (TV Series) as Marianne
1994: City Slickers II: The Legend of Curly's Gold as Mitch's Mother
1995–1996: High Society (TV Series, Recurring role) as Alice Morgan
1997: The Nanny (TV Series) as herself
1998: Homicide: Life on the Street (TV Series) as Mrs. Cochran
1999: Diagnosis Murder (TV Series) as Connie Masters
1999: The Story of Us as Dot (final film role)

References

Actress filmographies
Chinese filmographies
American filmographies